James Richard Benstead (born 8 March 1979) is an English cricketer.  Benstead is a right-handed batsman who bowls right-arm medium.  He was born in Burton-on-Trent, Staffordshire.

Benstead made his List A debut for the Derbyshire Cricket Board in the 2000 NatWest Trophy against the Gloucestershire Cricket Board.  He played 5 further List A matches for the Board, the last coming against the Middlesex Cricket Board in the 1st round of the 2003 Cheltenham & Gloucester Trophy which was held in 2002.  In his 6 List A matches for the Board, he scored 165 runs at an average of 27.50, making 2 half centuries and a high score of 65.  His highest score came against Bedfordshire in the 2002 Cheltenham & Gloucester Trophy.

He later joined Staffordshire, who he played Minor counties cricket for from 2004 to 2006, making 11 Minor Counties Championship appearances and a single MCCA Knockout Trophy appearance.  He played a single List A match for Staffordshire, in the 2005 Cheltenham & Gloucester Trophy against Surrey.  In this match, he scored 5 runs before being dismissed by James Ormond.

References

External links
Jamie Benstead at ESPNcricinfo
Jamie Benstead at CricketArchive

1979 births
Living people
Sportspeople from Burton upon Trent
English cricketers
Derbyshire Cricket Board cricketers
Staffordshire cricketers